Iota (Ι, ι) is the ninth letter of the Greek alphabet.

Iota or IOTA may also refer to:

 Ɩ or Latin iota, a letter of the Latin alphabet
 Iota (Cyrillic) (Ꙇ, ꙇ), a letter of the Cyrillic alphabet

Science and technology
 Infrared Optical Telescope Array
 Integrable Optics Test Accelerator — electron and proton low energy storage ring and test facility at Fermilab
 Iota toxin, a type of pore-forming toxin that acts to destroy the actin cytoskeleton.
 International Occultation Timing Association
 SARS-CoV-2 Iota variant, a variant of SARS-CoV-2, the virus that causes COVID-19

Mathematics
 Denoted by i, the Imaginary unit in the complex number system.

Computing
 , a function generating a vector of every integer from 0 to -1 (index origin zero) in APL
 Iota and Jot, two esoteric programming languages
 IOTA (technology), open-source distributed ledger (directed acyclic graph or DAG, a blockchain alternative)

Organizations
 International Ovarian Tumor Analysis trial and group, founded to develop standardized terminology
 Intra-European Organisation of Tax Administrations

Arts and entertainment
 Iota, a superhero in the comic book Heroes
 Colony Iota, a location in Xenoblade Chronicles 3
 Iota (singer), Australian singer and actor, born Sean Hape
 Iota, a syndicated newspaper comic strip by Mike Keefe and Tim Menees
 Iota, 2022 album by Lous and the Yakuza

Other uses
 Iota, Louisiana, a town in the US
Iota (Italian ship), a vessel from the port of Naples, wrecked in December 1893
 Islands on the air (IOTA), a list of islands maintained by the Radio Society of Great Britain
 Hurricane Iota, a late-season Category 4 Atlantic hurricane in 2020

See also
 Iota-carrageenan, a type of gelling carrageenan used in the food industry
 Iota-carrageenase, an enzyme
 Jota (disambiguation)